Édgar José Ron Vásquez (born August 8, 1981), is a Mexican television actor best known for his roles in telenovelas such as Juro que te amo, Los exitosos Pérez, La que no podía amar, La mujer del Vendaval and Muchacha italiana viene a casarse.

Personal life 

Ron is the son of Rómula Vásquez Castro and Jacinto Ron Rodríguez. He has three brothers named Daniel Vásquez, Alejandro Vásquez and Julio Vásquez.

Career

2004-10: Early in his career 
José Ron left his hometown of Guadalajara at age 18 to study acting in the "Centro de Actuación de Televisa". Ron began his acting career in 2004 on the telenovela Mujer de madera with Edith González, Ana Patricia Rojo, Jaime Camil and Gabriel Soto. In 2005 he participated in the television series Bajo el mismo techo, where he appeared in 11 episodes. In 2006 he participated in the third season of the telenovela Rebelde where he played Enzo. In this telenovela he shared credits with Maite Perroni, Dulce María, Anahí, Christian Chávez and Alfonso Herrera. In 2006, Ron was one of the protagonist in the telenovela Código postal, in which he stood out more as an actor. In 2007, he had a recurring role in the telenovela Muchachitas como tú. In 2008, he made his debut as a protagonist in the telenovela Juro que te amo where he shared credits with Ana Brenda Contreras. In 2010, he received several recognitions for his stakes in the telenovela Los exitosos Pérez, Locas de amor and Cuando me enamoro.

2011-present: New projects 
In 2011, Ron returned to star in another telenovela along with Ana Brenda Contreras entitled, La que no podía amar, for which he received the award TVyNovelas Award for Best Young Lead Actor. In 2012, he obtained his first leading role in the telenovela La mujer del Vendaval where he shared credits with Ariadne Díaz and Javier Jattin. In 2014 he starred next to Livia Brito, in the remake of the 1971 Mexican telenovela, Muchacha italiana viene a casarse, which was lengthened to 176 chapters due to its success in Mexico.

In 2015, Ron debuted in cinema in the film A la mala , starring Mauricio Ochmann and Aislinn Derbez. In that same year producer Ignacio Sada gave him the lead role in the telenovela Simplemente María, which is an adaptation of the 1989 telenovela, where he shared credits with Claudia Álvarez and Ferdinando Valencia.

Filmography

Films

Television

Music videos

Awards and nominations

References

External links 

1981 births
Living people
Mexican male telenovela actors
Male actors from Guadalajara, Jalisco
21st-century Mexican male actors